You Love You is the second studio album of American glam rock band Semi Precious Weapons. It was released on June 29, 2010 by Interscope Records.

Track listing

Reception

You Love You received mixed to positive reviews from critics upon release. On Metacritic, the album holds a score of 71/100 based on 4 reviews, indicating "generally favorable reviews."

References

2010 albums
Semi Precious Weapons albums
Interscope Records albums